Morley and Rothwell was a parliamentary constituency represented in the House of Commons of the Parliament of the United Kingdom. It elected one Member of Parliament (MP) by the first past the post system of election.

History
This constituency was created in 1997 and abolished in 2010. It was held for the entire period of its existence by the Labour Party.

Boundaries
The City of Leeds wards of Middleton, Morley North, Morley South, and Rothwell.

The constituency covered the West Yorkshire towns of Morley and Rothwell, the villages that surround the towns, and the old pit village of Middleton.

Boundary review
Following their review of parliamentary representation in West Yorkshire, the Boundary Commission for England created a number of modified constituencies as a consequence of a falling population.

A new constituency of Elmet and Rothwell was created to move Rothwell from this seat. The successor seat to Morley and Rothwell is Morley and Outwood, which attached wards from Wakefield to the Morley area.  Middleton was transferred to the Leeds Central seat.

Members of Parliament

Elections

Elections of the 1990s

Elections of the 2000s

See also
List of parliamentary constituencies in West Yorkshire

Notes and references

Constituencies of the Parliament of the United Kingdom established in 1997
Constituencies of the Parliament of the United Kingdom disestablished in 2010
Politics of Leeds
Parliamentary constituencies in Yorkshire and the Humber (historic)